Bhavesh Baria (born 14 May 1990) is an Indian cricketer who plays for Gujarat. He made his first-class debut for Gujarat, against Hyderabad, on 1 December 2012, in the 2012–13 Ranji Trophy.

References

External links
 

1990 births
Living people
Indian cricketers
Gujarat cricketers
People from Valsad district